The Mercedes V6 Hybrid Formula One engine, is a series of 1.6-liter, hybrid turbocharged V6 racing engines which features both a kinetic energy recovery system (MGU-K) and a heat energy recovery system (MGU-H), developed and produced by Mercedes-AMG High Performance Powertrains for Formula One. These engines were in use since 2014 by the Mercedes works team. Over years of development, the engine power managed to increase, from 840 horsepower at 15,000 rpm, to 1,070 horsepower at 15,000 rpm. Customer engines were used by Williams, McLaren, Lotus, Manor Racing, Force India, Racing Point Force India, Racing Point and Aston Martin.

Since the 2014 season, the Mercedes V6 Hybrid engine was proved to be one of the most successful Formula One engines of all time. Breaking the record for most wins in a season in 2016, as well as among many other major constructor's and driver's F1 records. Notably, Lewis Hamilton became one of the most successful Formula One drivers by winning six Driver's Championships and Mercedes-AMG Petronas Formula One Team won a record breaking eight consecutive Constructor's Championships in F1 cars, which were powered by these Mercedes V6 Hybrid engines.

List of Formula One engines

Statistics

The Formula One regulations in  saw Mercedes produce a hybrid 1.6-liter turbocharged V6 engine, which features a kinetic energy recovery system (MGU-K) and a heat energy recovery system (MGU-H). The engine started the season with a clear advantage, with these Mercedes engined cars scoring the majority of the points. Since the introduction of this engine formula, Mercedes powered cars have achieved pole position in 121 and won 114 of the 184 races (as of the 2023 Saudi Arabian Grand Prix), and won 7 Drivers' Championships and 8 Constructors' Championships.

Season statistics of Mercedes-AMG Petronas Formula One Team

Other applications

Mercedes-AMG ONE

The Mercedes-AMG ONE production hypercar features a similar powertrain as in modern Formula One cars. Production version of the car is based on a modified version of the  Mercedes-Benz PU106B Hybrid E-turbo V6 engine, used in the Mercedes F1 W06 Hybrid Formula One car. Some modifications were done to the engine due to the engine's illegality in RPM idle and redline. Torque figures are unknown due to the complex powertrain.

The internal combustion engine works in conjunction with four electric motors: a  Motor Generator Unit-Kinetic (MGU-K) coupled to the crankshaft, a  Motor Generator Unit-Heat (MGU-H) coupled to the turbocharger, and two electric motors in the front axle producing . The MGU-K and MGU-H are similar as in use in Formula One cars, which were responsible for recovering energy and improving efficiency during operation of the car. More specifically, the MGU-K serves to generate electricity during braking, while the MGU-H serves to eliminate turbocharger lag and improve throttle response by keeping the turbine spinning at high speeds. The final two electric motors drive the front wheels to allow for an all-wheel drive drivetrain, and the sum of these four electric motors contributes  effective power to the total power output figure of the AMG ONE.

The head of Mercedes-AMG, Tobias Moers, states that the engine will be at 1,280 rpm when in idle, and at 11,000 rpm when at its redline limit.

References

Mercedes-Benz engines
Formula One engines
Engines by model
Gasoline engines by model
V6 engines